Johannes Human (6 September 1930 – 20 January 1997) was a South African sports shooter. He competed at the 1956 Summer Olympics and the 1960 Summer Olympics.

References

1930 births
1997 deaths
South African male sport shooters
Olympic shooters of South Africa
Shooters at the 1956 Summer Olympics
Shooters at the 1960 Summer Olympics
Sportspeople from Bloemfontein
20th-century South African people